Os Church may refer to:

Os Church (Innlandet), a church in Os municipality in Innlandet county, Norway
Os Church (Vestland), a church in Os municipality in Vestland county, Norway
Os Church (Viken), a church in Rakkestad municipality in Viken county, Norway